Boutiquea is a monotypic genus of flowering plants in the family Annonaceae containing the single species Boutiquea platypetala. It is native to Cameroon and Equatorial Guinea.

This plant is known to science by only 14 specimens collected from eight locations. It has showy flowers and fruits. Its pollen is shed as permanent tetrads. It grows in evergreen forest habitat.

This is a vulnerable species threatened by habitat loss as forest is cleared for agriculture.

References

Flora of Cameroon
Flora of Equatorial Guinea
Annonaceae
Monotypic magnoliid genera
Annonaceae genera
Taxonomy articles created by Polbot